The 2019 Indy Pro 2000 championship presented by Cooper Tires was the 21st season in series history. A 16-race schedule was announced on 25 September 2018, featuring five permanent road circuits and two street circuits on the NTT IndyCar Series hosting doubleheaders, and single races at the Dave Steele Classic and World Wide Technology Raceway, a flat intermediate oval. Following the departure of Mazda from the Road to Indy program, it was the first championship run under the new "Indy Pro 2000" name instead of the previous "Pro Mazda Championship."

American Kyle Kirkwood of RP Motorsport won nine of the sixteen races yet still found himself in a close fight for the championship with Swedish driver Rasmus Lindh of Juncos Racing. Lindh won only three times, but fifth or better in every race and only finished off the podium three times. Kirkwood only needed to start the final race to clinch the championship and was knocked out by an incident on the first lap of the final race, leaving the final points margin of victory a scant two points. Canadian Parker Thompson of Abel Motorsports won the opening doubleheader of the season but not again for the rest of the season and finished third in points, well back of Kirkwood and Lindh. Sting Ray Robb captured two poles but was winless and finished fourth in points while Singaporean driver Danial Frost won twice and finished fifth, rounding out the season's winners.

Juncos edged out RP for the Teams' championship by a significant margin despite Lindh losing out on the championship on the back of Robb's strong performance in their second car. RP's second car was piloted by three different drivers who tallied only two podium finishes between them.

Drivers and teams

Schedule

Race results

Championship standings

Drivers' Championship
Scoring system

 The driver who qualifies on pole is awarded one additional point.
 One point is awarded to the driver who leads the most laps in a race.
 One point is awarded to the driver who sets the fastest lap during the race.

Teams' championship
Scoring system

Single car teams receive 3 bonus points as an equivalency to multi-car teams
Only the best two results count for teams fielding more than two entries

See also
2019 IndyCar Series
2019 Indy Lights
2019 U.S. F2000 National Championship

References

External links
 

2019
Indy Pro 2000